The Great Saint John Fire was an urban fire that devastated much of Saint John, New Brunswick in June 1877. It destroyed two-fifths of the city of Saint John.

Fire

At 2:30 on the afternoon of June 20, 1877, a spark fell into a bundle of hay in Henry Fairweather's storehouse in the York Point Slip area. The fire had killed approximately 19 people, and injured many more. No photographs exist of the fire. However, some survivors' accounts of the blaze tell that the fire came so close to the harbour that it looked like the water was on fire.

Aftermath and legacy
Saint John's Trinity Royal Heritage Conservation Area was built out of the ashes of the fire.

See also
 History of firefighting
 List of fires in Canada
 List of disasters in Canada

References

External links
 The Story of the Great Fire in St. John, N.B., June 20th, 1877 by George Stewart - Available through Project Gutenberg
 The Great fire on website.nbm-mnb.ca
"St. John, N. B., Burned", Scientific American article, 07 July 1877, p. 3

1877 in Canada
1877 fires in North America
History of Saint John, New Brunswick
Accidental deaths in New Brunswick
1877 disasters in Canada
Urban fires in Canada
Maritime incidents in June 1877